Lassissi is an African surname. Notable people with the surname include:

Ismaila Lassissi (born 1969), Ivorian rugby union footballer
Saliou Lassissi (born 1978), Ivorian footballer

Surnames of African origin